Littlefield Municipal Airport  is three miles west of Littlefield, in Lamb County, Texas.

Most U.S. airports use the same three-letter location identifier for the FAA and IATA, but this airport is LIU to the FAA and has no IATA code.

Facilities
It has two asphalt runways: 1/19 is 4,021 by 60 feet (1,226 x 18 m) and 13/31 is 2,513 by 40 feet (766 x 12 m).

In the year ending June 24, 2009 the airport had 7,025 aircraft operations, average 19 per day: 99.6% general aviation and 0.4% military.
24 aircraft were then based at this airport: 50% single-engine, 4% jet, 42% glider and 4% ultralight.

References

External links 
  at Texas DOT Airport Directory
 Aerial image as of January 1996 from USGS The National Map
 
 

Airports in Texas
Buildings and structures in Lamb County, Texas
Transportation in Lamb County, Texas